Football Club Verbroedering Dender Eendracht Hekelgem, also simply known as Dender or Verbroedering Dender, is a Belgian association football club based in Denderleeuw. From the 2022–23 season, the club will be playing in the Challenger Pro League after winning Belgian National Division 1.

The club is named after former clubs KFC Denderleeuw Eendracht Hekelgem and Verbroedering Denderhoutem, which merged at the end of the 2004–05 season, and after the river Dender, which crosses the town of Denderleeuw. The home stadium of the club is Florent Beeckmanstadion, located in Denderleeuw. Their best league ranking was the 15th place in the first division (in 2007–08 and 2008–09). The club colours are blue and black.

History

Early history
Verbroedering Denderhoutem was founded in 1935 and registered to the Royal Belgian Football Association in 1943. They first reached the Promotion (4th-highest level in Belgian football) in the 1980s. After several relegations and promotions in the provincial leagues and Promotion, the club finally reached the third division in 1998–99. They remained at that level except for one season in 2003–04 when they played in the Promotion. After one season back at the third level, Denderhoutem merged with fellow club KFC Denderleeuw EH from the third division.

Rise to the top tier
Verbroedering Dender won consecutively the third division A title (in 2005–06) and the second division title (in 2006–07), to reach the first division in 2007–08 for the first time in their history. They achieved promotion after beating Dessel 0–2 on the second division's 33rd match day on 13 May 2007. They finished at the 15th place in 2007–08 and again in 2008–09, though the club was relegated at the end of the 2008–09 season because the number of clubs in the first division was reduced from 18 to 16.

Post–top division history
The club was relegated from the Second Division in the 2011–12 season after finishing second bottom.

In the 2015–16 season, Dender qualified for the newly formed Belgian third tier named Belgian First Amateur Division. In the 2020–21 season, the division was renamed Belgian National Division 1 but the season was cancelled after one game due to the COVID-19 pandemic in Belgium.

They won promotion back to the second tier, now renamed the Challenger Pro League, in the 2021–22 season. The promotion was not without controversy. On the penultimate game of the promotion play-offs against RFC Liège on 22 May 2022, Dender lost 1–0 which saw them move into second place and Liège move to first place. The following day, it was announced that Liège would receive a three-point deduction and a €1000 fine after failing to field enough U21 players in their 3–0 win against Dender back in March 2022. As a result, Dender were awarded a 5–0 win and moved back to the top of the table. Liège released a statement to say that they would be appealing the decision. However, the points deduction would turn out to be irrelevant. This is because Liège lost on the final game of the season against Knokke, while Dender won 1–0 against Dessel Sport.

Honours 
Belgian Second Division Final Round:
Runners-up (1): 1997–98
Belgian Third Division A:
Winners (1): 2005–06
Belgian Second Division:
Winners (1): 2006–07
Belgian National Division 1
Winners (1): 2021–22

Players

Current squad 
Updated 24 January 2023.

Out on loan

References

External links 
 FCV Dender at UEFA.COM
 FCV Dender at EUFO.DE
 FCV Dender at Weltfussball.de
 FCV Dender at Football Squads.co.uk
 FCV Dender at National Football Teams.com
 FCV Dender at Football Lineups.com
 Official twitter

 
Football clubs in Belgium
Sport in East Flanders
1935 establishments in Belgium
Association football clubs established in 1935
Belgian Pro League clubs